Sakakawea (or Bird Woman or Sacajawea) is a monumental sized bronze sculpture created by Leonard Crunelle.  It was dedicated on October 13, 1914 and stands on the grounds of the North Dakota State Capitol in Bismarck, North Dakota.

Description
The statue is a full length figure of Sakakawea (also called Sacagawea or Sacajawea) carrying her baby, Jean Baptiste Charbonneau, on her back.  It carries the inscription:

SAKAKAWEA / THE SHOSHONE INDIAN "BIRDWOMAN" WHO IN 1805 GUIDED THE LEWIS AND CLARK EXPEDITION / FROM THE MISSOURI RIVER TO THE YELLOWSTONE / ERECTED BY THE FEDERATED CLUBWOMEN AND SCHOOLCHILDREN OF NORTH DAKOTA / PRESENTED TO THE STATE OCTOBER 1910.

Crunelle used an Hidatsa woman, Mink Woman, as his model for the 12 foot tall statue that stands on a large rock on the east side of the capitol grounds.  The statue was funded in part by the North Dakota federation of Women's Clubs.

National Statuary Hall Collection 
Another casting of the work was done around 2003 and was placed in the National Statuary Hall Collection in the Capitol Building in Washington, D.C., one of the two statues there from North Dakota.

See also
 1910 in art
 Sacagawea dollar
 Sacajawea and Jean-Baptiste (sculpture), Portland, Oregon
 Lewis and Clark (sculpture), Salem, Oregon
 Meriwether Lewis and William Clark (sculpture), Charlottesville, Virginia
 Oregon History (mural), Portland, Oregon

References

External links
 

1910 establishments in North Dakota
1910 sculptures
2003 establishments in Washington, D.C.
2003 sculptures
Bronze sculptures in the United States
Bronze sculptures in Washington, D.C.
Cultural depictions of Sacagawea
Monuments and memorials in Washington, D.C.
National Statuary Hall Collection
Sculptures in North Dakota
Sculptures of Native Americans in Washington, D.C.
Sculptures of women in Washington, D.C.